Aulonemia fuentesii is a species of bamboo in the genus Aulonemia. The species is part of the grass family and is endemic to Latin America.

References

fuentesii